Caryomyia is a genus of hickory gall midges in the family Cecidomyiidae. They are often known as the hickory gall midges since most species feed on various species of hickory. There are at least 30 described species in Caryomyia.

Species

References

Further reading

External links

 

Cecidomyiinae
Cecidomyiidae genera
Gall-inducing insects